Heikki Sorsa (born 10 February 1982) is a Finnish snowboarder. He competed in the men's halfpipe event at the 2002 Winter Olympics. He also held a world record for the highest air in a quarter pipe for six years, with the result of 9.3 metres.

References

1982 births
Living people
Finnish male snowboarders
Olympic snowboarders of Finland
Snowboarders at the 2002 Winter Olympics
Sportspeople from Helsinki